Olympas (meaning "heavenly") was a Roman Christian whom Paul of Tarsus saluted in around 65 AD.

Olympas is regarded in the Eastern Orthodox Church as being one of the Seventy disciples. His feast day is November 10.

References

Seventy disciples
Saints from Roman Italy
People in the Pauline epistles